PCMC Polytechnic, Pune was established in 1990 managed by the Pimpri Chinchwad Education Trust, Pune.

Pimpri Chinchwad Polytechnic is a technical institute, approved by the All India Council of Technical Education (AICTE). It is located near Akurdi Railway Station.

Departments

Automobile Department
Civil Department
Computer Department
E & TC Department
IT Department
Mechanical Department

Courses offered

Electronic & Telecommunication Engineering
Computer Engineering
Civil Engineering
Information Technology
Mechanical Engineering
Automobile Engineering

See also
 List of educational institutions in Pune

References

External links 
 

Universities and colleges in Pune
Education in Pimpri-Chinchwad
Educational institutions established in 1990
1990 establishments in Maharashtra